Lasarte-Oria  is a town located in the province of Gipuzkoa, in the Autonomous Community of Basque Country, northern Spain. It was founded in 1986. It is estimated to have a population of around 19.000 people inhabitants.

References

External links
 Official Website Infoasa - Auñamendi Encyclopedia (Euskomedia Fundazioa) Information available in Spanish

Municipalities in Gipuzkoa